William Carson was a Scottish-born U.S. soccer player who earned one cap with the United States national team in an 8–1 loss to England on May 28, 1959.  At the time, he played for the Los Angeles Kickers.

Carson scored the game-winning goal for the Los Angeles Kickers in the 1958 National Challenge Cup final.

See also
List of United States men's international soccer players born outside the United States

References

External links
 

Year of birth missing
Possibly living people
American soccer players
United States men's international soccer players
Los Angeles Kickers players
Association football forwards
Scottish emigrants to the United States